Events in the year 2018 in Suriname.

Incumbents 
 President: Dési Bouterse
 Vice President: Ashwin Adhin
 Speaker: Jennifer Simons

Events

Deaths

31 January – Erwin de Vries, painter and sculptor (b. 1929).

19 December – James Ramlall, or Bhai, poet (b. 1935).

References

 
2010s in Suriname
Years of the 21st century in Suriname
Suriname
Suriname